This is a list of works written by the French composer Francis Poulenc (1899–1963).

As a pianist, Poulenc composed many pieces for his own instrument in his piano music and chamber music. He wrote works for orchestra including several concertos, also three operas, two ballets, incidental music for plays and film music. He composed songs (mélodies), often on texts by contemporary authors. His religious music includes the Mass in G major, the Stabat Mater and Gloria.

Overview 

The composer had written a catalogue of his works in 1921, which is reproduced in Schmidt's book. According to this list, the first noted piece was in 1914 Processional pour la crémation d'un mandarin for piano, now lost or destroyed. Poulenc completed his last work, his Oboe Sonata, in 1962.

Piano, chamber music and songs

As a professional pianist, Poulenc wrote many pieces for his own instrument. He was a prolific writer of works of chamber music, often with piano, and some works for two pianos. Poulenc composed many songs (mélodies), most of them accompanied by piano, but some also in versions with a small instrumental ensembles, for example his Rapsodie nègre for baritone, flute, clarinet, string quartet and piano. He composed easily for woodwind instruments, scoring for example a piano trio with oboe and bassoon instead of the traditional violin and cello. Poulenc was less familiar with string instruments. The cellist Pierre Fournier helped him to write the Cello Sonata, which he premiered with the composer as the pianist. Poulenc destroyed all sketches for string quartets and three for violin sonatas, while only the fourth one survived, but was received critically.

Orchestra and stage

Among his works with orchestra are three operas, two ballet, incidental music for plays, film music and concertos, some with unusual solo instruments such as harpsichord and organ. The harpsichordist Wanda Landowska inspired the composition of the Concert champêtre.

Collaboration in the group Les Six

Poulenc was a member of the group of composers Les Six, with Georges Auric, Louis Durey, Arthur Honegger, Darius Milhaud and Germaine Tailleferre, and contributed to their collective productions, which included another ballet.

Sacred music and choral music

Poulenc turned to writing also religious music in the 1930s, composing a Mass in G major for a cappella choir. He composed the Stabat Mater in 1950 in memory of the painter Christian Bérard in 1950. The late Gloria for soprano, choir and orchestra became one of his best-known works. He drew inspiration for his sacred compositions mostly from liturgical texts.

 Songs 

For his songs and song cycles, he often collaborated with contemporary poets, setting poems by writers such as Guillaume Apollinaire, Louis Aragon, Paul Éluard, Max Jacob, Federico García Lorca, and Louise de Vilmorin, whom he mentioned in titles. He further set poems by Théodore de Banville, Maurice Carême, Colette, Robert Desnos, Maurice Fombeure, Marie Laurencin, Madeleine Ley, François de Malherbe, Ronsard, Jean Moréas, Jean Nohain and Paul Valéry, among others. In 1943, during the occupation of France, a cantata Figure humaine on poems by Éluard which celebrate Liberté.

List of works by FP number
The Music of Francis Poulenc (1899–1963): A Catalogue, abbreviated FP, is a chronological catalogue of Francis Poulenc's works which was published by Carl B. Schmidt in 1995. Schmidt provides for each known composition, which includes unfinished, unpublished and lost works, a detailed history of composition and performance, and lists manuscripts and publications.

In the table, the works are initially listed by the FP number. Other information given is the French title, a translation if commonly used, the key, the scoring if not clear from the title, the year(s) of composition, the genre, text information, notes and a free score when available, and the page number in the catalogue. Abbreviations used are "rev." for "revised", "orch." for "orchestration", arr. for "arrangement" and "sc." for "score".

In Genre, instrumental pieces are distinguished as orchestral and chamber music, particularly that for piano. The group of stage works contains operas, ballets and incidental music, while film scores are marked separately. Sacred and secular music for voice is divided in choral, for cantatas and motets, and vocal, holding songs and song cycles.

List of works by genre

Stage works

Ballet

 Les mariés de la tour Eiffel, ballet (1921; a collaborative work by all the members of Les Six except Louis Durey); Poulenc's contributions, Discours du General (Polka) and La Baigneuse de Trouville are listed as FP 23 in Schmidt's Poulenc catalog
Les biches, ballet (1922/23), FP 36
Pastourelle (1927; for the children's ballet L'éventail de Jeanne, to which ten French composers each contributed a dance; this excerpt became better known in its piano transcription), FP 45
Les animaux modèles, ballet (1941), FP 111

Opera

Les mamelles de Tirésias, opera (1947), FP 125
Dialogues of the Carmelites, opera (1957) Composed 1953-6, FP 159
La voix humaine, monodrama (1959), FP 171

Orchestral
 Sinfonietta, FP 141 (1947)
 "Matelote provençale", variation for La guirlande de Campra, FP 153 (1952)
 "Bucolique" for Variations sur le nom de Marguerite Long, FP 160 (1954)

Concertante
Concert champêtre, for harpsichord and orchestra, (1927–1928), FP 49
Aubade, a "Concerto choréographique" for piano and 18 instruments, FP 51 (1929)
 Concerto for two pianos and orchestra in D minor (1932), FP 61
 Concerto for organ, strings and timpani in G minor (1938), FP 93
 Concerto for piano and orchestra (1949) FP 146

Vocal/choral orchestral
Le bal Masqué, secular cantata on poems by Max Jacob (Baritone or mezzo soprano, ensemble) (1932), FP 60
Sécheresses (SATB, orchestra) (1939), FP 90
Litanies à la Vierge Noire (SSA, org) (1936), orchestrated (1947), FP 82
Stabat Mater (Soprano solo, SATB divisi, orchestra) (1950), FP 148
Gloria (Soprano solo, SATB divisi, orchestra) (1959), FP 177
La dame de Monte-Carlo (Soprano solo, orchestra) (1961), FP 180
Sept répons des ténèbres (Child Soprano, Men's Chorus, Children's Chorus, orchestra) (1961-2), FP 181

Chamber/Instrumental
Rapsodie nègre, for flute, clarinet, string quartet, baritone and piano, FP 3 (1917)
Sonata for two clarinets, FP 7 (1918/1945)
Trois mouvements perpétuels for 9 instruments, FP 14 (1946)
Sonata for clarinet and bassoon, FP 32 (1922/1945)
Sonata for horn, trumpet and trombone, FP 33 (1922/1945)
Trio for oboe, bassoon and piano, FP 43 (1926)
Bagatelle in D minor for violin and piano, FP 60c (1932)
Villanelle for pipe (pipeau) and piano, FP 74 (1934)
Suite française for 2 oboes, 2 bassoons, 2 trumpets, 3 trombones, percussion and harpsichord, FP 80 (1935)
Sextet for piano and wind quintet, FP 100 (1932–9)
Un joueur de flûte berce les ruines, for flute (1942)
Violin Sonata, FP 119 (1942–3/1949)
L'Invitation au Chateau, FP 138 (1947)
Cello Sonata, FP 143 (1940–48)
Flute Sonata, FP 164 (1956–7)
Élégie for horn and piano, FP 168 (1957) In memory of Dennis Brain
Sarabande for guitar, FP 179 (1960)
Clarinet Sonata, FP 184 (1962)
Oboe Sonata, FP 185 (1962)

Piano

Solo piano

Piano four hands

Sonata for piano, 4 hands, FP 8

Two pianos

Sonata for 2 pianos, FP 156
L'embarquement pour Cythère, valse-musette for 2 pianos (from film, Le voyage en Amérique), FP 150
Élégie (en accords alternés), for 2 pianos, FP 175
Capriccio for 2 pianos (after Le bal Masqué), FP 155

Choral
Chanson à boire (TTBB) (1922), FP 31
Sept chansons (SATB) (1936), FP 81
Litanies à la vierge noire (SSA, org) (1936), orchestrated (1947), FP 82
Les Petites Voix (SSA a cappella) (1936) FP 83 (Madeleine Ley) (I. La Petite Fille sage - II. Le Chien perdu - III. En rentrant de l'école - IV. Le Petit garçon malade - V. Le Hérisson) 
Mass in G (SATB) (1937), FP 89
Sécheresses (chorus, orchestra) (1937), FP 90
Quatre motets pour un temps de pénitence (SATB): "Vinea mea electa", (1938); "Tenebrae factae sunt", (1938); "Tristis est anima mea", (1938); "Timor et tremor", (1939), FP 97
Exultate Deo (SATB) (1941), FP 109
Salve Regina (SATB) (1941), FP 110
Figure humaine (12 voices) (1943), FP 120
Un soir de neige (6 voices) (1944), FP 126
Chansons françaises: "Margoton va t'a l'iau", (SATB)(1945); "La belle se sied au pied de la tour" (SATBarB) (1945); "Pilons l'orge" (SATBarB) (1945); "Clic, clac, dansez sabots" (TBB) (1945); "C'est la petit' fill' du prince" (SATBarB) (1946); "La belle si nous étions" (TBB) (1946); "Ah! Mon beau laboureur" (SATB) (1945); "Les tisserands" (SATBarB) (1946), FP 130
Quatre petites prières de saint François d’Assise (Men's chorus) (1948), FP 142
Quatre motets pour le temps de Noël (Mixed chorus): "O magnum mysterium" (1952); "Quem vidistis pastores?" (1951); "Videntes stellam" (1951); "Hodie Christus natus est" (1952), FP 152
Ave verum corpus (SMezA) (1952), FP 154
Laudes de Saint Antoine de Padoue (Men's Chorus): "O Jésu perpetua lux" (1957); "O proles hispaniae" (1958); "Laus regi plena gaudio" (1959); "Si quaeris" (1959), FP 172

Vocal
Rapsodie nègre: see Chamber/Instrumental, above.
Le Bestiaire, ou le Cortège d'Orphée pour Baryton et Orchestre de Chambre, FP 15a (poems by Apollinaire) (I: Le dromadaire II: La chèvre du Thibet III: La sauterelle IV: Le dauphin V: L'écrevisse VI: La carpe) (1918-1919)
Le Bestiaire, ou le Cortège d'Orphée pour Baryton et Piano, Trois Melodies Inedites (VII La Colombe, VIII Le Serpent, IX La Puce), FP 15bCinq poèmes de Max Jacob (I:"Chanson Bretonne" II:"Cimetière" III:"La petite servante" IV:"Berceuse" V:"Souric et Mouric") (1931), FP 52Miroirs Brûlants (2 Poems by Paul Eluard. I:"Tu vois le feu du soir" II:"Je nommerai ton front") (1938), FP 98Poèmes de Ronsard (I:"Attributs", II: "Le tombeau", III: "Ballet", IV: "Je n'ai plus les os", V: "À son page") (1925), FP 38Chansons Gaillardes (anonymous 17th-century texts, I:"La Maîtresse volage", II: "Chanson à boire", III: "Madrigal", IV: "Invocation aux Parques", V: "Couplets bachiques", VI: "L'Offrande", VII: "La Belle Jeunesse", VIII: "Sérénade") (1925-1926), FP 42Quatre airs chantés (I:"Air romantique", II: "Air champêtre", III: "Air grave", IV: "Air vif") (1927–28), FP 46Quatre poèmes de Guillaume Apollinaire (1931, FP 58) for voice and piano (I. L'Anguille - II. Carte postale - III. Avant le cinéma - IV. 1904) A sa guitare (poem by Pierre de Ronsard) (1935), FP 79Tel jour telle nuit (poems by Paul Éluard), I: "Bonne journée", II: "Une ruine coquille vide", III. "Le front comme un drapeau perdu", IV. "Une roulotte couverte en tuiles", V. "A toutes brides", VI. "Une herbe pauvre", VII. "Je n'ai envie que de t'aimer", VIII. "Figure de force brûlante et farouche", IX. "Nous avons fait la nuit" (1936–1937), FP 86Le portrait (poem by Colette) (1937), FP 92Priez pour paix (poem by Charles d'Orléans) (1938), FP 95La grenouillère (poem by Apollinaire) (1938), FP 96Deux poèmes d'Apollinaire (poems by Apollinaire: I: "Dans le jardin d'Anna", II: "Allons plus vite") (1939), FP 94Bleuet (poem by Apollinaire) (1939), FP 102Fiançailles pour rire (poems by Louise de Vilmorin: I: "La Dame d'André", II: "Dans l'herbe", III: "Il vole", IV: "Mon cadavre est doux comme un gant", V: "Violon", VI: "Fleurs") (1939), FP 101Banalités (poems by Apollinaire: I: "Chanson d'Orkenise", II: "Hôtel", III: "Fagnes de Wallonie", IV: "Voyage à Paris", V: "Sanglots") (1940), FP 107
 "Les Chemins de l'amour" (originally written as part of the incidental music for Jean Anouilh's Léocadia (1940); the remainder of the Léocadia music is lost.), FP 106Chansons villageoises (I: "Chanson du clair tamis", II: "Les gars qui vont à la fête", III: "C'est le joli printemps", IV: "Le mendiant", V: "Chanson de la fille frivole", VI: "Le retour du sergent"), FP 117 (1942)Deux poèmes de Louis Aragon (I: "C", II: "Fêtes galantes") (1943), FP 122Métamorphoses (1943) FP 121 for voice and piano (Louise de Vilmorin) (I. Reine des mouettes - II. C'est ainsi que tu es - III. Paganini)L'Histoire de Babar, le petit éléphant for Piano and Narrator (1940 – orchestrated by Jean Françaix 1945), FP 142Deux poèmes d'Apollinaire (I: "Montparnasse", II: "Hyde Park") (1941–1945), FP 127Deux poèmes d'Apollinaire (I: "Le pont", II: "Un poème") (1946), FP 131Paul et Virginie (poem by Raymond Radiguet) (1946), FP 132Le disparu (poem by Robert Desnos) (1946), FP 134Calligrammes (Guillaume Apollinaire): I. L'Espionne - II. Mutation - III. Vers le Sud - IV. Il pleut - V. La Grâce exilée - VI. Aussi bien que les cigales - VII. Voyage (1948), FP 140La Fraîcheur et le feu (poems by Paul Éluard), I: "Rayon des yeux", II: "Le matin les branches attisent", III: "Tout disparut", IV: "Dans les ténèbres du jardin", V: "Unis la fraîcheur et le feu", VI: "Homme au sourire tendre", VII: "La grande rivière qui va" (1950), FP 147Rosemonde (poem by Apollinaire) (1954), FP 158Parisiana (poems by Max Jacob: I: "Jouer du Bugle", II: "Vous n'écrivez plus?") (1954), FP 157Le travail du peintre (poems by Paul Éluard), I: "Pablo Picasso", II: "Marc Chagall", III: "Georges Braques", IV: "Juan Gris", V: "Paul Klee", VI: "Joan Miro", VII: "Jacques Villon" (1956), FP 161Deux mélodies (I: "La Souris" (Apollinaire), II: "Nuage" (Laurence de Beylié)) (1956), FP 162Dernier poème (poem by Robert Desnos) (1956), FP 163La Courte Paille (poems by Maurice Carême), I: "Le sommeil", II: "Quelle aventure!", III: "La reine de Coeur", IV: "Ba, be, bi, bo, bu", V: "Les anges musiciens", VI: "Le carafon", VII: "Lune d'Avril" (1960), FP 178

References

 Bibliography 
 
 
 
 
 
Roy, Jean: Francis Poulenc Oeuvres complètes (1963-2013) L'Édition du 50e Anniversaire - EMI/Warner France Classics' 20 CD release marking the 50th anniversary of Poulenc's death.  The in-depth accompanying material entitled, Francis Poulenc 1899-1963, L'intégrale de ses oeuvres, Edition du 50e anniversaire 1963-2013'' was translated to English by Hugh Graham.

External links
 
 List of works by musical genres – Francis Poulenc (1899–1963) (in French) BNF
 Francis Poulenc (1899–1963) / Compositions (in French) BNF

 
Poulenc